István Gyulay is a Hungarian sprint canoer and marathon canoeist who competed in the early 1990s. He won a gold medal in the C-2 10000 m event at the 1991 ICF Canoe Sprint World Championships in Paris.

References

Hungarian male canoeists
Living people
Year of birth missing (living people)
ICF Canoe Sprint World Championships medalists in Canadian
20th-century Hungarian people